Tacoma Boatbuilding Company (sometimes Tacoma Boat) was a shipyard at 1840 Marine View Drive, Tacoma, Washington, in the United States. It was established in 1926 and closed in 1992.

History 
Tacoma Boat was established in 1926 and built many boats during World War II. The shipyard grew rapidly in the 1970s and early 1980s but got into difficulty with several large government contracts and filed for Chapter 11 protection in 1985. It emerged from bankruptcy in 1986 but could not recover and closed in 1992. In 1998, the company was liquidated.

Some of the boats constructed include:

 
 
 
 
 
 
 
 
  including

References

See also 
 
 

Defunct shipbuilding companies of the United States
Vehicle manufacturing companies established in 1926
Vehicle manufacturing companies disestablished in 1992
Manufacturing companies based in Washington (state)
Defunct companies based in Tacoma, Washington
Shipbuilding in Washington (state)